The following is a list of films originally produced and/or distributed theatrically by Metro-Goldwyn-Mayer and released between 1950 and 1959.

See also 
 Lists of Metro-Goldwyn-Mayer films

References 

1950-1959
American films by studio
1950s in American cinema
Lists of 1950s films